Jak oni śpiewają (How They Sing) – TV show aired in Poland, which is Polish version of Soapstar Superstar.

Presenters

The judging panel

4th Judge

Seasons

How They Celebrate (Christmas Special)

Running order

How The Sing – Child's Day

Individual judges scores in charts below (given in parentheses) are listed in this order from left to right: Agnieszka Włodarczyk, Krzysztof Respondek, Artur Chamski, Laura Samojłowicz.

Running order

Individual judges scores in charts below (given in parentheses) are listed in this order from left to right: Edyta Górniak, Rudi Schuberth, Elżbieta Zapendowska, Małgorzata Żak

Running order

Statistics

Perfect 12's (6.0+6.0)

Perfect 18's (6.0+6.0+6.0)

Perfect 24's (6.0+6.0+6.0+6.0)

Average Scores of All Stars
Those in bold are couples who won the competition.

Viewing figures

External links
 Official website

 
Polish reality television series
Music competitions in Poland
Singing talent shows